, also known as Donjara, is a kids version of the table game mahjong played in Japan. Ponjan (also spelled Pom Jong in English) has three types of tiles: cars, boats and airplanes. Donjara is the Bandai registered trademark version of this game. The game is played with 2 to 4 players.

, Bandai Namco has sold  units since 1984.

See also
List of Japanese games

References

External links
 Webpage about the two versions 

Mahjong